Saleh Najem is a Kuwaiti handball player. He competed in the men's tournament at the 1980 Summer Olympics.

References

External links

Year of birth missing (living people)
Living people
Kuwaiti male handball players
Olympic handball players of Kuwait
Handball players at the 1980 Summer Olympics
Place of birth missing (living people)